The corvette Magallanes was ordered by the Chilean government after the disastrous consequences of the War against Spain in 1864-1866 and the rising border conflict with the neighboring countries at the end of the 1870s.

In the extreme southern region of Chile
In 1874 she was ordered to travel to the Strait of Magellan to produce charts of the Angostura Inglesa in the Messier Channel, and of the Bahia Possession in the strait.

In January 1876, during patrols off the extreme southern region of Chile and under the command of Juan José Latorre, the French ship Jeanne Amelie was seized off the coast of Rio Negro as they loaded guano without a Chilean license. By the attempt to bring the ship to Punta Arenas, the Jeanne Amelie sank on 27 April 1876 at the eastern entrance of the Strait of Magellan. Later the American ship Devonshire was also seized.

In 1877, also under the command of Juan José Latorre, the crew of the corvette put down "El motín de los artilleros" ("The Mutiny of the Artillerymen") and restored the rule of law in Punta Arenas. In July 1878, Magallanes was despatched from Punta Arenas to Melville Sound to tow the British barque , which had been struck by a wave and severely damaged, in to Punta Arenas. The two ships arrived there on 2 August.

War of the Pacific
The Magallanes was a protagonist of the Battle of Chipana in April 1879, the first naval battle of the war. In September 1879 she was refitted in Valparaíso and Carlos Condell took the command of the ship. In November she was involved in the amphibious assault on the port of Pisagua.

Civil War of 1891

During the civil war of 1891 she sided with the Junta of Iquique.

In 1906 the ship was decommissioned, handed over to the Merchant Navy. In 1907 she sank off Corral.

See also
 List of decommissioned ships of the Chilean Navy
 Naval Campaign of the War of the Pacific

References

Steam corvettes of the Chilean Navy
1873 ships
Maritime incidents in April 1876
Ships built on the River Thames
Merchant ships of Chile
Steamships of Chile
Maritime incidents in 1907